Christopher Anton Knight (born November 7, 1957) is an American actor and businessman. He is best known for playing Peter Brady on the 1970s series The Brady Bunch. He has since gone on to become a successful businessman and enjoyed a semi-resurgence in the public eye with television appearances in the 2000s.

Early life and work
Knight was born in New York City, New York, the son of Wilma and Edward Knight, an actor. Knight's father was born Edward Kozumplik, to parents from the Austro-Hungarian Empire, while Knight's mother was Jewish.

After the end of his Brady Bunch appearances, Knight's acting career consisted mostly of making guest appearances on other television shows (Happy Days, The Love Boat), and occasional film roles (Just You and Me, Kid, Curfew, Good Girls Don't, The Doom Generation, and Nowhere). He reunited with his former Brady costars in the holiday TV movie A Very Brady Christmas (1988). Before the Brady Bunch series, he had had some small television roles, including an appearance on the first season of Mannix, in a 1967 episode called "Coffin for a Clown".

Computer career
In 1988, Knight, a self-described "geek", left acting to pursue a business career in the computer industry. He got a job as an account sales manager for Martec, Inc. and landed that company's first million-dollar sales deal within his first 18 months on the job, for which he was named Employee of the Year. In 1989, he was named Vice President of Design System Marketing and Sales at New Image Industry.

In 1991, he co-founded Visual Software, a pioneering 3D graphics company. In 1995, he founded Kidwise Learningware, a company that manufactures interactive educational products. In 1996, he joined the keyboard manufacturer Adesso, and in 1997, he became Vice President of Marketing at iXMicro, a video hardware company. In 1998, he founded his own TV tuner company, Eskape Labs; it was purchased by Hauppauge Computer Works in 2000.

Return to television

On April 17, 1994, Knight lost his professional wrestling debut in a "Dark Match" at the Spring Stampede in Chicago at the Rosemont Horizon. His adversary was another child star from 1970s television, the Partridge Familys Danny Bonaduce.

Knight appeared on a special episode of The Weakest Link that featured The Brady Bunch cast members squaring off against each other. Knight won the show and donated the proceeds ($49,000) to his selected charity, Zero Population Growth.

Continuing to pursue TV opportunities, Knight appeared on VH1's fourth season of The Surreal Life. The show garnered Knight more attention than he had received in quite some time, in part because he appeared shirtless on the show, revealing a well-built body. During his stint on the show, he began a romance with castmate model Adrianne Curry, winner of America's Next Top Model cycle 1, who is almost 25 years younger than Knight. After the show, the two moved in together and got engaged, as documented on the VH1 series My Fair Brady, which premiered on September 11, 2005. The series was renewed for another season, and the couple wed in Curry's hometown of Joliet, Illinois, on May 29, 2006, in a Gothic-style wedding.

Knight was featured in Click Five's music videos for "Just the Girl", in which he played a high school teacher, and for "Catch Your Wave", as the hotel manager.

Knight and former Brady Bunch co-star Barry Williams appeared in a 2006 episode of That '70s Show, in which he and Williams portrayed a gay couple who moved in next door. The two had remained close friends since their Brady Bunch days, and Williams appeared several times on My Fair Brady. Florence Henderson, who played Carol Brady, Susan Olsen, who played Cindy Brady, and Mike Lookinland, who played Bobby Brady, also appeared in an episode of that series.

Knight participated in VH-1's retrospective miniseries, I Love The '70s: Volume II. He, his family, and friends appeared on the season finale of NBC's Celebrity Family Feud on July 29, 2008.
During the 2008–09 television season, Knight hosted the syndicated game show, Trivial Pursuit: America Plays. He has hosted a series of Jonathan Goodson-produced game show specials for the Michigan Lottery, Make Me Rich. The first special was scheduled for October 16, 2009, with a second scheduled for February 2010. The show aired periodically until early 2012. Knight joined with the other Brady Bunch cast in the 2019 television series A Very Brady Renovation on HGTV. In 2021, he starred in the Lifetime Christmas movie, Blending Christmas, alongside his Brady Bunch co-stars Barry Williams, Mike Lookinland, Susan Olsen, and Robbie Rist.

In 2022, Knight, Williams, and Lookinland competed in season eight of The Masked Singer as "Mummies". They were eliminated in the third episode, which aired as the October 3 "TV Theme Night" alongside Daymond John as "Fortune Teller".

Personal life
Knight has been married four times. Knight proposed to his third wife, model and reality television personality Adrianne Curry, on the season finale of My Fair Brady, on VH1, which aired on November 6, 2005. The show was renewed for a second season that began in June 2006, and focused on the couple's wedding preparations. The couple wed in Curry's hometown of Joliet, Illinois on May 29, 2006, in a gothic-style wedding. Knight's manager, Phil Viardo, told a celebrity gossip website on May 29, 2011, that Knight and Curry were announcing their separation. The date was the couple's fifth wedding anniversary. On February 2, 2012, on G4's Attack of the Show, Curry said the divorce had been finalized. He married his fourth wife, Cara Kokenes, in November 2016.

Filmography

Film

Television

References

External links

 Christopher Knight Brands Official website
 
 

1957 births
Living people
20th-century American businesspeople
20th-century American male actors
21st-century American businesspeople
21st-century American male actors
American game show hosts
American male child actors
American male film actors
American male soap opera actors
American male television actors
American male voice actors
American people of Austrian descent
American people of Russian descent
Businesspeople from New York City
Male actors from New York City